Fred Kelton Gage, Jr. (June 20, 1925 – October 5, 2017) was an American lawyer and politician.

Kelly Gage was born in Minneapolis, Minnesota. He served in the United States Navy during World War II. Gage received his law degree from University of Minnesota Law School in 1950. Gage practiced law in Mankato, Minnesota. Gage served on the Mankato School Board, from 1957 to 1966. Gage also served on the Minnesota State College Board and the Metropolitan Sports Facilities Authority. He served in the Minnesota Senate from 1967 to 1972 as a Republican.

Gage died in Mankato in 2017. His father Fred Kelton Gage also served in the Minnesota Legislature.

Notes

1925 births
2017 deaths
Politicians from Minneapolis
Politicians from Mankato, Minnesota
Military personnel from Minnesota
University of Minnesota Law School alumni
Lawyers from Minneapolis
School board members in Minnesota
Republican Party Minnesota state senators
20th-century American lawyers